Quo Vadis 2 is a video game developed and published by Glams for the Sega Saturn.

Gameplay
Quo Vadis 2 is a squad-level real-time game featuring customizable mechs.

Reception
Next Generation reviewed the Saturn version of the game, rating it four stars out of five, and stated that "Glams may not have created the next big game, but Western designers should watch their backs when it turns its attention to Quo Vadis 3."

References

1997 video games
Japan-exclusive video games
Real-time strategy video games
Sega Saturn games
Sega Saturn-only games
Tactical role-playing video games
Video games about mecha
Video games developed in Japan
Video game sequels